Purav Raja and Divij Sharan won the first edition of the tournament, defeating Édouard Roger-Vasselin and Igor Sijsling in the final,  7–6(7–4), 7–6(7–3).

Seeds

Draw

Draw

References
Main Draw

Claro Open Colombia - Doubles
2013 Doubles